Szczepanki may refer to:

Szczepanki, Brodnica County in Kuyavian-Pomeranian Voivodeship (north-central Poland)
Szczepanki, Grudziądz County in Kuyavian-Pomeranian Voivodeship (north-central Poland)
Szczepanki, Przasnysz County in Masovian Voivodeship (east-central Poland)
Szczepanki, Sierpc County in Masovian Voivodeship (east-central Poland)
Szczepanki, Warmian-Masurian Voivodeship (north Poland)